Jungle Cowboy is the debut album by guitarist Jean-Paul Bourelly which was recorded in late 1986 and released on the JMT label with distribution by Polygram.

Reception 
The AllMusic review by Brian Olewnick states "A couple of the tracks succeed marginally but, despite the occasional presence of outstanding musicians like Julius Hemphill and Andrew Cyrille, most of the songs remain leaden and slick, the musical equivalent of the glamour-style photos that adorn the album cover". Musician's reviewer in 1988 wrote about the album, "It's about rawness, and though it doesn't have an abundance of structural sophistication, Bourelly's debut is easily identifiable, i.e., he's got a vision.", Steve Holtje, in MusicHound's Jazz: The Essential Album Guide (1998), called Jungle Cowboy Bourelly's best album, and music critic Ben Watson called "Mother Earth" a sultry masterpiece.

Track listing 
All compositions by Jean-Paul Bourelly except where indicated
 "Love Line" - 4:39
 "Tryin' to Get Over" - 4:11
 "Drifter" - 5:08
 "Hope You Find Your Way" - 6:15
 "Jungle Cowboy" - 3:18
 "No Time to Share" - 3:34
 "Can't Get Enough" - 5:17
 "Parade" - 4:07
 "Mother Earth" (Peter Chatman) – 4:46
 "Groove With Me" - 4:30

Personnel 
 Jean-Paul Bourelly – lead guitar, vocals
 Julius Hemphill – alto saxophone
 Carl Bourelly – synthesizer, backing vocals
 Kelvyn Bell – rhythm guitar, backing vocals
 Freddie Cash – bass, backing vocals
 Kevin Johnson – drums, backing vocals
 Greg Carmouché – percussion, backing vocals
 Andrew Cyrille – drums (track 9)
 Alyson Williams – vocals (track 4)

References 

1987 albums
JMT Records albums
Winter & Winter Records albums